"Falling" is a song by American singer Trevor Daniel, released as the lead single from his debut EP Homesick (2018) and his debut studio album Nicotine (2020), by Alamo Records, Internet Money Records, and Interscope Records on October 5, 2018. The song was produced by KC Supreme, Taz Taylor and Charlie Handsome. A year later, the song started gaining popularity on short-form mobile videos platform TikTok and subsequently was added on various Spotify playlists and Viral Charts. It is his first charting single on the US Billboard Hot 100, and peaked at number 17. On January 15, 2020, a music video was released.

Background and composition
The song was conceived in "a matter of hours" during Daniel's first studio session with record producer Taz Taylor, whose record label, Internet Money, Daniel was previously signed to with Alamo and Interscope in July 2018. Daniel recalls that they attempted to add a second verse to the song, but decided against it, because "the energy just wasn't the same". The rough cut was released as the official song.

Music video

In 2018, Daniel released an initial music video which he described as "more of a short film to me than just a music video, and I’m excited to share my visions with everyone". The video was shot and edited by Mateo Mejia and Esteban Caicedo.

With the success of the song, a new official music video was filmed in 2019. It was directed by William Desena and officially premiered on January 15, 2020.

The video has over 235M views on YouTube and 1.1B streams on Spotify.

Charts

Weekly charts

Year-end charts

Certifications

Release history

References

2018 singles
2018 songs
Songs written by Taz Taylor (record producer)
Trevor Daniel (singer) songs

Song recordings produced by Taz Taylor (record producer)